Battery Ventures is an American technology-focused investment firm. Founded in 1983, the firm makes venture-capital and private-equity investments in markets across the globe from offices in Boston, Silicon Valley, San Francisco, Israel and London. Since inception, the firm has raised over $13 billion and is now investing its fourteenth funds, Battery Venture XIV and Battery Ventures Select Fund II, with a combined capitalization of $3.8 billion.

History
Battery Ventures was founded in 1983 in Boston, Massachusetts by Rick Frisbie, Howard Anderson  and Bob Barrett. Since its inception, Battery has raised more than $13 billion in capital through the following fourteen funds and corresponding side funds. 

The firm has offices in Boston, San Francisco, Menlo Park, Tel Aviv, London, and New York City.

Current investing general partners include: Neeraj Agrawal, Michael Brown, Morad Elhafed, Jesse Feldman, Russell Fleischer, Roger Lee, Chelsea Stoner, Dharmesh Thakker and Zack Smotherman.

Investments
As of 2021, Battery has invested in more than 450 companies, 69 of which have gone public and another 185 have merged or been acquired. 

The firm's current investment focus includes: 

Application software
Infrastructure software
Consumer
Industrial tech + life sciences

References

Further reading

 Venture Capitalists Ride Boom in Technology IPOs. Bloomberg, June 25, 2011
Drama and Pragmatism Drive Fight Over a Hiring.  The New York Times, December 24, 2001
Venture Capitalists See Investors Grow Mutinous.  The New York Times, April 14, 2002

External links
Battery Ventures (company website)

Companies based in Boston
Financial services companies established in 1983
Venture capital firms of the United States
1983 establishments in Massachusetts